His Name Is George Floyd: One Man's Life and the Struggle for Racial Justice is a 2022 biography about George Floyd written by Washington Post journalists Robert Samuels and Toluse Olorunnipa.

Synopsis
The book uses the life of George Floyd and his murder by police officer Derek Chauvin as a lens through which to examine racism in the United States. It draws from interviews with Floyd's friends and family and members of his local community. Floyd's ancestors are discussed—they worked as tenant farmers during the Reconstruction era. Aspects of Floyd's life such as his parenting, drug addiction and convictions are covered. Race-related commentary about education housing segregation, incarceration, police brutality and terrorism in the United States is connected to the life of Floyd.

Reception
Kehinde Andrews of The Guardian praised the book's coverage of Floyd, saying that it "does not paint him as a saint but explains his flaws in the context of his experiences". Andrews approved of the authors' "valiant effort to use Floyd's story to educate society about the ills of structural racism", but suggested that they could have focused on a subject such as Breonna Taylor to draw attention to the lesser covered oppression of Black women in the United States.

In The Atlantic, Imbolo Mbue similarly praised the authors "for presenting Floyd as the complex character that he was". Mbue recommended the book as "expertly researched" and "a necessary and enlightening read", highlighting in particular passages that celebrate African American culture and "depict how much Floyd was loved and how much he loved back". However, Mbue criticized that the book could have "more pointedly" highlighted the "hypocrisy of governments and corporations and all manners of institutions" that showed support for the Black Lives Matter movements out of ulterior motives.

References

2022 non-fiction books
Biographies about African-American people
Books about African-American history
History books about the 21st century
Murder of George Floyd
Non-fiction books about racism
Viking Press books